Probation is a 1960 Soviet drama film directed by Vladimir Gerasimov.

Plot 
The year is 1923. Zaitsev and Yegorov get jobs in criminal investigation. Yegorov must keep an eye on the documents, while Zaitsev is responsible for fighting with the criminals. And suddenly they get a case of a pharmacist's suicide...

Cast 
Oleg Yefremov as senior commissioner Ulyan Grigoryevich Zhur
 Oleg Tabakov as Sasha Yegorov
 Tamara Loginova as Katya, Yegorov's sister
Vyacheslav Nevinny as Sergei Zaitsev
 Boris Novikov as orderly Vorobeichik
Yevgeni Urbansky as chief of criminal investigation department Kurychyov
Mikhail Semenikhin as Afanasy Solovyov, Zhur's friend
Pavel Vinnik as Grigory Mitrofanovich Frinyov, apothecary
Tatyana Lavrova as Varya
Yelena Maksimova as crime victim
Valentina Tokarskaya as croupier in casino "Calcutta"
Albert Filozov as Komsomol organizer on subbotnik (uncredited)

References

External links 
 
1960 crime drama films
1960 films
1960s police procedural films
1960s Russian-language films
Films about police officers
Films set in 1923
Films set in the Soviet Union
Mosfilm films
Russian crime drama films
Soviet crime drama films